is a Japanese judoka.

After graduating from Nihon University, Mochida entered the Tokyo Metropolitan Police Department and won a silver medal at the -78 kg category of the World Championships in 1989.

He was good at Okuriashi harai, Harai tsurikomi ashi and Uchi mata.

Mochida retired after All-Japan Police Championships in 1998. As of 2009, he coaches All-Japan men's judo team and so on.

Achievements
1984 - All-Japan Junior Championships (-78 kg) 1st
1985 - All-Japan University Championships (-78 kg) 1st
1986 - Kodokan Cup (-78 kg) 3rd
1987 - All-Japan Selected Championships (-78 kg) 2nd
 - All-Japan University Championships (-78 kg) 1st
1988 - Kodokan Cup (-86 kg) 3rd
1989 - World Championships (-78 kg) 2nd
 - All-Japan Selected Championships (-78 kg) 1st
 - Kodokan Cup (-78 kg) 1st
1990 - Jigoro Kano Cup (-78 kg) 3rd
 - Tournoi Super World Cup Paris (-78 kg) 1st
 - Kodokan Cup (-78 kg) 1st
1991 - All-Japan Selected Championships (-78 kg) 3rd
1992 - Jigoro Kano Cup (-78 kg) 1st
 - All-Japan Selected Championships (-78 kg) 2nd
1993 - All-Japan Selected Championships (-78 kg) 3rd
1994 - All-Japan Selected Championships (-78 kg) 1st
 - Kodokan Cup (-78 kg) 2nd
1995 - All-Japan Selected Championships (-78 kg) 2nd
 - All-Japan Police Championships (Middleweight) 1st
1996 - All-Japan Police Championships (-86 kg) 1st
1997 - All-Japan Police Championships (-86 kg) 2nd

References

1965 births
Living people
Japanese male judoka
Sportspeople from Fukuoka Prefecture
Nihon University alumni
20th-century Japanese people